Schinia simplex is a moth of the family Noctuidae. It is found in the western Great Plains from North Dakota to New Mexico.

The wingspan is about 30 mm.

Larvae have been recorded on Ipomoea leptophylla.

External links
Images
Butterflies and Moths of North America

Schinia
Moths of North America
Moths described in 1891